Peter Ane Schat (5 June 1935, in Utrecht – 3 February 2003, in Amsterdam) was a Dutch composer.

Schat studied composition with Kees van Baaren at the Utrecht Conservatoire and the Royal Conservatory of The Hague from 1952 until 1958, and then went on to study in London with Mátyás Seiber in 1959 and with Pierre Boulez in Basle in 1960–61. His early training with van Baaren and Seiber disposed him toward twelve-tone technique, and his earliest compositions, such as the Introductie en adagio in oude stijl (1954) and the Septet (1957), combine traditional forms with dodecaphony. Boulez, however, led him to a more radical, strict form of serialism, and he was regarded in the Netherlands as one of the outstanding representatives of the avant garde. While still a student he created his opus 1, Passacaglia and Fugue for organ (1954), and Septet (1957). In 1957 he also won the Gaudeamus International Composers Award.

In the late sixties Schat became associated with the Provo (movement); their publications were printed in his cellar. He was involved in the notorious 1969 "notenkrakersactie" (Nutcracker Action) in which a group of activists interrupted a concert by the Concertgebouw Orchestra, demanding an open discussion of music policy. That same year, Schat contributed, together with the composers Reinbert de Leeuw, Louis Andriessen, Jan van Vlijmen, and Misha Mengelberg, and the writers Harry Mulisch and Hugo Claus,  in Reconstructie, a sort of opera, or "morality" theatre work, about the conflict between American imperialism and liberation.

In February 1969 he co-founded the Studio for Electro-Instrumental Music (STEIM) in Amsterdam. Among his most widely noted works are Thema (from 1970) and To You (from 1972). To You was performed at the Holland Festival.

The 1970s also brought Schat's most distinctive contribution to 20th-century music theory, the "tone clock". It lends its name to a translation of his collected essays, The Tone Clock (Contemporary Music Studies) (1993, Taylor and Francis Verlag).

Schat died in 2003 from cancer.

Composition

Symphonies
Symphony No. 1 (1978, rev 1979)
Symphony No. 2 (1983, rev. 1984)
Symphony No. 3 (1998-2003)
Chamber music
Octet (1958)
Improvisations and symphonies (1960)
Signalement (1961)
First Essay on Electrocution (1966)
Hypothema (1969)
Choir music
The Fall (1960)
The Fifth Season (1973)
Breath (1984)
An Indian Requiem (1995)
Opera and music theater
Labyrint (1966)
Reconstructie (1969)
Houdini (1977)
Aap verslaat de knekelgeest (1980)
Symposion (1989)
Piano music
Variations (1956)
Inscriptions (1959)
Anathema (1969)
Polonaise (1981)
Other
Passacaglia and Fugue for organ (1954)
Clockwise and Anti-Clockwise for 16 wind instruments (1967)
Thema (1970)
To you (1972)
Canto General
Kind en Kraai
De Hemel (1990)

Sources

Footnotes

External links
Official website
 http://www.peterschat.nl/composition.html (in English)

1935 births
2003 deaths
Dutch male classical composers
Dutch classical composers
Dutch opera composers
Twelve-tone and serial composers
Musicians from Utrecht (city)
Deaths from cancer in the Netherlands
Gaudeamus Composition Competition prize-winners
20th-century Dutch male musicians